The Volkswagen G60 and G40 were inline-four cylinder automobile petrol engines, which uses a specific method of forced induction by way of a scroll-type supercharger. The G60 engine was formerly manufactured by the German automaker Volkswagen Group, and was installed in a limited number of their 'hot hatch' cars from their Volkswagen Passenger Cars marque from August 1988 to July 1993.

A smaller G40 engine of identical design was previously installed in the Mk2 Volkswagen Polo GT G40 from August 1986 to July 1994.

Design and specifications
Its cylinder block is constructed from grey cast iron, and its cylinder head is cast aluminium alloy, with additional post-production heat treatment. The crankcase contains a forged steel crankshaft which runs in five main bearings, and cast pistons with increased size gudgeon pins. It has two valves per cylinder (eight valves in total), which are operated by a toothed belt-driven forged steel single overhead camshaft (SOHC) via hydraulic valve lifters, with the valves being closed by two concentric valve springs. Charged air is cooled via an intercooler, and the operation and control of the engine, is managed by a Bosch Digifant engine control unit, which includes common rail electronic multi-point fuel injection and a knock sensor.

Although it was based on an existing Volkswagen Group engine from their EA827 series, it underwent so many modifications, that it is usually regarded as a separate powerplant from others which the Group produced. It was named after the "G-Lader" magnesium-cased supercharger that it was mated to - this supercharger had a  diameter inlet, hence the "G60" moniker. It utilized a side-mounted intercooler (SMIC), positioned in front of the left front wheel, to lower the temperature of the compressed charged engine intake air.

The G60 engine was developed from an earlier, smaller version called the G40 based on their EA111 series.

Applications
The original "G-Lader" engine, the smaller version of the G60 engine, called the G40, was previously used in the Mk2 Volkswagen Polo Coupé GT G40 supermini.

The larger G60 engine debuted in August 1988 in the B3 Volkswagen Passat G60 saloon, and the Mk2 Volkswagen Golf G60 hatchback.

A month later, in September 1988, the Volkswagen Corrado G60 was released.

In the United States, the G60 engine was used only in the Corrado, and this was dropped in 1992 in Favour of the newer, more powerful VR6 engine.

It included a larger intercooler, which is mounted across the full width of the radiator.

A 16-valve G60 engine was used in the ultra-rare Golf Limited, of which only 71 were produced by VW Motorsport, all with four-wheel drive.

The G60 engine, like any supercharged or turbocharged engine, was sensitive to high air temperatures, so engine performance very much depended on the weather conditions. Some models, like the Golf Rallye, or even some variants of the Golf G60, had a bigger, better-placed intercooler, resulting in increased, and more consistent performance compared to the standard placed intercooler.

VW engine ID codes
All Volkswagen G-Lader internal combustion engines are inline four-cylinder SOHC designs, operate on the four-stroke cycle petrol engines with Bosch Digifant electronic multi-point fuel injection, are water-cooled, and use a G-Lader supercharger:

Future use of technology

Technologies found in the G40 and G60 engines have subsequently been used in other Volkswagen engines. They first used this technology with turbochargers in their Turbodiesel 'TD' engines. Then, this evolved into their highly regarded range of Turbocharged Direct Injection 'TDI' diesel engine. Turbochargers have also been of great benefit to recent petrol engines in the Volkswagen Group.

See also 
list of Volkswagen Group petrol engines
list of Volkswagen Group diesel engines
list of discontinued Volkswagen Group petrol engines
list of discontinued Volkswagen Group diesel engines
list of North American Volkswagen engines
Wasser boxer
VR6 engine
Turbocharged Direct Injection (TDI)
Suction Diesel Injection (SDI)
BlueMotion
list of Volkswagen Group platforms

References

External links
Volkswagen Group corporate website
Chemnitz (Germany) - engine plant Mobility and Sustainability
Kassel (Germany) - engine plant Mobility and Sustainability
Salzgitter (Germany) - engine plant Mobility and Sustainability
Polkowice (Poland) - engine plant Mobility and Sustainability
São Carlos (Brazil) - engine plant Mobility and Sustainability
Shanghai (China) - engine plant Mobility and Sustainability
Audi at a glance - includes information on the Győr engine plant
Corrado G60 Forum - Corrado G60 Forum with History, Owners Register and Buyers Guide

Volkswagen Group engines
Superchargers
Lists of automobile engines
Straight-four engines
Gasoline engines by model